Pseudoskenella depressa is a species of sea snail, a marine gastropod mollusk in the family Pyramidellidae, the pyrams and their allies.

Description
The shell grows to a length of 1.1 mm and a height of 1.5 mm. It feeds on the tube worm Galeolaria caespitosa

Distribution
This marine species occurs subtidally and offshore off Tasmania, and Eastern Australia (Queensland, New South Wales and Victoria)

References

  Atlas of Living Australia : Occurrence Record: Malacology:C.344598

External links
 To World Register of Marine Species
 http://seashellsofnsw.org.au/Pyramidellidae/Pages/Pseudoskenella_depressa.htm

Pyramidellidae
Gastropods described in 1973